Sergio Sinistri (born 11 April 1952) is an Argentine sailor. He competed in the Tornado event at the 1984 Summer Olympics, finishing in 15th place.

References

External links
 

1952 births
Living people
Argentine male sailors (sport)
Olympic sailors of Argentina
Sailors at the 1984 Summer Olympics – Tornado
Place of birth missing (living people)